The Ilych is a river in the Komi Republic in northwest Russia. It drains part of the northern Ural Mountains westward into the upper Pechora. The Ilych freezes up in early November and stays icebound until late April. Its main tributaries are the rivers Kogel and Palyu. The Pechora-Ilych Nature Reserve lies along the left bank of the Ilych.

References 

Rivers of the Komi Republic